This is a list of electoral results for the Electoral district of East Coolgardie in Western Australian colonial elections.

Members for East Coolgardie

Election results

Elections in the 1890s

References

Western Australian state electoral results by district